Zhou Fang may refer to:

 Zhou Fang (Han dynasty) (周防), Eastern Han scholar
 Zhou Fang (Three Kingdoms) (周魴), Eastern Wu
 Zhou Fang (Jin dynasty) (周訪), c. 260-320 Jin dynasty general
 Zhou Fang (Tang dynasty) (周昉), Tang dynasty painter